R'n'r may refer to:

R&R, military abbreviation for rest and recuperation
Rock and roll, a genre of popular music